Balhae (698–926) or Bohai was a mixed ethnic Goguryeo–Mohe kingdom established after the fall of Goguryeo. Balhae occupied southern parts of Northeast China, Primorsky Krai, and the northern part of the Korean peninsula.

See also
 Balhae
 Jurchen Jin emperors family tree
 List of monarchs of Korea
 Silla
 North South States Period
 List of rulers of China

Balhae
Balhae